Merbein West is a locality in the Rural City of Mildura, Victoria, Australia. Merbein West post office opened on 1 July 1919 and was closed on 30 June 1971.

References